An excitatory amino acid receptor antagonist, or glutamate receptor antagonist, is a chemical substance which antagonizes one or more of the glutamate receptors.

Examples include:

 AP5
 Barbiturates
 Dextromethorphan
 Dextrorphan
 Dizocilpine
 Ethanol
 Ibogaine
 Ifenprodil
 Ketamine
 Kynurenic acid
 Memantine
 Nitrous oxide
 Perampanel
 Phencyclidine

See also
 Excitatory amino acid receptor agonist
 Excitatory amino acid reuptake inhibitor
 N-methyl-D-aspartate receptor antagonist

External links

References

Amino acids